Shaveh-ye Beyt Mansur (also Romanized as Shāveh-ye Beyt Manṣūr) is a village in Moshrageh Rural District, Moshrageh District, Ramshir County, Khuzestan Province, Iran. At the 2006 census, its population was 168, in 33 families.

References 

Populated places in Ramshir County